Trexler is a surname. Notable people with the surname include:

Georg Trexler (1903–1979), German composer
Harry Clay Trexler (1854–1933), American industrialist who built a business empire in Allentown, Pennsylvania
Marion Trexler (1891–1968), American racing driver
Richard Trexler (1932–2007), professor of History at the State University of New York at Binghamton